British S-class submarine (1931), British class of submarines.
 Spanish Shark-class submarine, Spanish class of minisubs.